Genhe (Gegengol), formerly Ergun Left Banner or Ergun Zuoqi, is a county-level city in the far northeast of Inner Mongolia, China, under the administration of Hulunbuir City.

Geography and climate

Administrative divisions 
Genhe is divided into four subdistricts, four towns, and one ethnic township.

Subdistricts 
The city's four subdistricts are Hedong Subdistrict, and Haolibao Subdistrict.

Towns 

Ethnic Townships 
The city's sole ethnic township is the Aoluguya Evenk Ethnic Township.

Demographics 
As of 2019, Genhe is home to 130,722 inhabitants, the 72nd most of Inner Mongolia's 103 county-level divisions. As of 2017, 64,400 of Genhe's residents lived in urban areas.

Economy 
Genhe's gross domestic product in 2019 totaled 3,200,870,000 renminbi (RMB), growing at a rate of 2.0% over 2018. Of this, 16.87% came from the city's primary sector, 18.04% came from the city's secondary sector, and 65.09% came from the city's tertiary sector.

Consumer retail sales in Genhe for 2019 totaled 2,305,160,000 RMB.

Households in Genhe earned, on average, 28,375 RMB in disposable income in 2019.

Genhe reported 71,030,000 RMB in public budget revenue in 2019, the lowest of Inner Mongolia's 103 county-level divisions.

As of 2019, there are 119,000 mobile phone subscriptions and 29,200 internet subscriptions in Genhe.

Agriculture 
In 2019, Genhe produced 5,000 tons of grain, ranking 86th among the 96 county-level divisions in Inner Mongolia which reported this statistic. The city also produced 1,167 tons of meat in 2019, ranking 97th among the Inner Mongolia's 103 county-level divisions.

Education 
As of 2019, Genhe has seven primary schools and nine secondary schools.

Healthcare 
Genhe's medical institutions have 477 beds staffed by 942 personnel, as of 2019.

Culture 
A small number of ethnic Evenk reindeer herders remain in the city's Aoluguya Evenk Ethnic Township.

Transportation 
 of highway run through Genhe as of 2019.

References

 
County-level divisions of Inner Mongolia
Hulunbuir